Royal Naval College  may refer to:

 Royal Naval Academy in Portsmouth (1733–1837), renamed the Royal Naval College in 1806
 Royal Naval College, Greenwich (1873–1998)
 Royal Naval College, Osborne (1903–1921)
 Royal Naval College, Dartmouth (1905–present), renamed Britannia Royal Naval College in 1953

See also

 Royal Naval College of Canada (1911–1922)
 Royal Australian Naval College (1911–present)
 Royal Canadian Naval College (1942–1947)
 Royal New Zealand Naval College (1963–present)
 Royal Naval Engineering College
 Royal Naval College (Netherlands)